The 1955 Maryland State Hawks football team was an American football team that represented Maryland State College (now known as University of Maryland Eastern Shore) in the Central Intercollegiate Athletic Association (CIAA) during the 1955 college football season. In their eighth season under head coach Vernon McCain, the team compiled a 9–0 record (7–0 against conference opponents), won the CIAA championship, and shut out seven of nine opponents.  

At the end of the season, the team was ranked No. 2 among the nation's black college football teams by the Pittsburgh Courier. Maryland State earned a 23.55 rating, three points behind No. 1 Grambling (26.42) due to the fact that Grambling had played a tenth game. 

Key players included sophomore back Johnny Sample who went on to play 11 seasons in the National Football League and American Football League.

Schedule

After the season

The 1956 NFL Draft was held on January 17–18, 1956. The following Hawks were selected.

References

Maryland State
Maryland Eastern Shore Hawks football seasons
College football undefeated seasons
Maryland State Hawks football